The 1942 Arkansas gubernatorial election was held on November 3, 1942.

Incumbent Democratic Governor Homer Martin Adkins won re-election to a second term unopposed.

Democratic primary

The Democratic primary election was held on July 28, 1942.

Candidates
Homer Adkins, incumbent Governor
Fred Keller, educator
Bill Neill, salesman
Vernon Heath, real estate agent

Results

General election

Candidates
Homer Martin Adkins, Democratic

The Republican Party did not offer a slate of candidates for state offices in 1942.

Results

References

Bibliography
 
 

1942
Arkansas
Gubernatorial
November 1942 events